Los Angeles fire may refer to:
Topanga Fire, 2005 fire in San Fernando Valley
October 2007 California wildfires
2009 California wildfires
La Tuna Fire, September 2017 fire in Verdugo Mountains
December 2017 Southern California wildfires
One of several fires in and around Griffith Park

See also
List of California wildfires
:Category:Fires in California